The missing Sun motif is a theme in the myths of various cultures. It may have served to explain any of several natural phenomena, including the disappearance of the Sun at night (the Egyptian version of the motif described below is an example), the shorter days during the winter (for example, the Japanese one mentioned below), or even solar eclipses. Most myths following the motif involve the disappearance of a solar deity, through imprisonment, exile or death.

Some other tales are similar, such as the Sumerian story of Inanna's descent into the underworld. These may have parallel themes but do not fit in this motif unless they concern a solar deity.

Examples

In Egyptian mythology, Ra passes through Duat (the underworld) every night. Apep has to be defeated in the darkness hours for Ra and his solar barge to emerge in the east each morning.

In Japanese mythology, the sun goddess Amaterasu is angered by the behavior of her brother, Susanoo, and hides herself in a cave, plunging the world into darkness.

In Norse mythology, both the gods Odin and Tyr have attributes of a sky father, and they are doomed to be devoured by wolves (Fenrir and Garm, respectively) at Ragnarok. Sol, the Norse sun goddess, will be devoured by the wolf Skoll.

Mythology
Sun myths
Literary motifs